Efim Arsentievich Liberman (February 1, 1925, Moscow – September 3, 2011, Jerusalem). Soviet and Russian biophysicist and physiologist, winner of the USSR State Prize (1975).

Biography 
Born into the family of the agronomist Azriil Alterovich Liberman (b. 1885), a native of Suwalki, Poland, and mathematics teacher Sima Khaimovna Izrael (b. 1895), a native of Bialystok, Poland. From 1943 he fought in the Great Patriotic War as an assistant commander of a rifle platoon of the 31st Guards Rifle Division (Bryansk Front). Efim was seriously wounded during the war, and was awarded the For Valour medal for personal courage and bravery in battle.

Efim Liberman graduated from the Moscow State University’s Physics Department in 1949. He worked as a radio engineer at Design Bureau No. 1, and in 1951 he joined the Elemental Electric Coal Institute as a senior engineer. In 1953 he held a junior researcher position at the Institute of Roentgenology and Radiology.

From 1955 to 1967 he worked as a researcher at the USSR Academy of Sciences’ (now Russian Academy of Sciences) Institute of Biophysics. From 1967 to 2006 he was a researcher at the USSR Academy of Sciences’ Institute for Information Transmission Problems, becoming a chief researcher in 1994.

In 1975, alongside V.P.Skulachev, L.M. Tsofina, and A. Yasaitis, he was awarded the USSR State Prize for a series of works studying molecular generators and electric current transformers.

In 1959 he was awarded the title Candidate in Physical and Mathematical Sciences. In 1963 he received a doctoral degree in Biological Sciences.

Efim Liberman proposed the idea of a molecular computer as a cellular function (Cytomolecular Computing, 1972) and, alongside Svetlana Minina, he developed the idea of the brain as a quantum molecular computer that processes information at the intracellular level. Based on these ideas, he developed a unitary theory of physical and biological sciences.

Family 
Efim Liberman’s first wife was Varvara Viktorovna Shklovskaya-Kordi (b. 1927), a physicist and daughter of the writer Viktor Shklovsky. His son from his first marriage, Nikita Efimovich Shklovsky-Kordi (b. 1952) is a Сandidate of Biological Sciences, physiologist, and a leading researcher at the Russian Health Ministry’s Hematology Research Centre.

His second wife was Elena Borisovna Vershilova (b. 1937), daughter of theater director and teacher Boris Ilyich Vershilov (Westerman). They had two sons, Mikhail and Petr (Azriel).

Efim’s third wife was Svetlana Vladimirovna Minina, a biophysicist and physiologist. They had six children, including daughters Anna (b. 1981) and Maria (b. 1978), sons Daniil (b. 1982), David (b. 1984), and Gavriil. David and Daniil produced the TV show Mult Lichnosti on Channel One Russia, which aired from 2009 to 2013. They are entrepreneurs and founders of the venture capital fund Brothers Ventures and Frank.Money in the US.

Books 
Dosimetry of Radioactive Isotopes. — M.: Medgiz, 1958. [Дозиметрия радиоактивных изотопов].

Generators and Pumps of the Cells. — M.: Znaniye, 1965. [«Генераторы» и «насосы» клетки ].

Electricity and Control of a Living Cell (together with S.V.Minina and N.E. Shklovsky-Kordi). — M.: Znaniye, 1978. [Электричество и управление живой клетки]

The Living Cell. — M.: Nauka, 1982. [Живая клетка]

The Brain as a System of Quantum Computers and the Way to Unification of the Sciences (together with S.V.Minina and N.E. Shklovsky-Kordi). — M.: AN USSR, Institute for Information Transmission Problems, 1987. [Мозг как система квантовых компьютеров и путь к объединению наук]

How a Living Cell Works Kak rabotayet zhivaya kletka. — M.: Znaniye, 1990. [Как работает живая клетка]

Academic journals and publications 
Liberman, E.A. (1957). "On the character of information entering the brain of a frog over one nerve fiber from two receptors of the retina". Biofizika (Moscow). 2 (4): pp. 427-430 (in Russian) 

Liberman, E.A. (1969). "Hypothesis about the role of cell membrane in the cell controlling systems". Moscow-Kaunas, pp. 147-15.

Liberman, E.A. (1972). "Cell as a molecular computer (MCC)". Biofizika (Moscow). 17: pp. 979-993.

Liberman, E.A. (1972). "Ionic and electronic transport through membranes and possible role of these processes in the operating of cell molecular computer". Proceedings of IV International Biophysical Congress, Nauka, Moscow, pp. 360-394.

Liberman E.A. (1974). "Cell as a molecular computer (MCC). IV. Price of action is a value characterizing the "difficulty" of the problem solution for the computer". Biofizika (Moscow). 19: pp. 152-155.

Liberman, E. A. (1979-08-01). "Analog-digital molecular cell computer". Biosystems. 11 (2): 111–124. doi:10.1016/0303-2647(79)90005-4. ISSN 0303-2647.

Liberman, E.A. (1979-12-01). "Biological physics and the physics of the real world". Biosystems. 11 (4): 323–327. doi:10.1016/0303-2647(79)90032-7. ISSN 0303-2647.

Liberman, E. A.; Topaly, V. P. (1968-09-17). "Selective transport of ions through bimolecular phospholipid membranes". Biochimica et Biophysica Acta (BBA) - Biomembranes. 163 (2): 125–136. doi:10.1016/0005-2736(68)90089-8. ISSN 0005-2736. 

Liberman, E. A.; Minina, S. V.; Shklovsky-Kordy, N. E.; Conrad, Michael (1982-01-01). "Microinjection of cyclic nucleotides provides evidence for a diffusional mechanism of intraneuronal control". Biosystems. 15 (2): 127–132. doi:10.1016/0303-2647(82)90026-0. ISSN 0303-2647.

Liberman, E. A.; Minina, S. V.; Mjakotina, O. L.; Shklovsky-Kordy, N. E.; Conrad, Michael (1985-07-08). "Neuron generator potentials evoked by intracellular injection of cyclic nucleotides and mechanical distension". Brain Research. 338 (1): 33–44. doi:10.1016/0006-8993(85)90245-8. ISSN 0006-8993.

Liberman, E.A.; Minina, S.V.; Myakotina O.L., Mamikonova T.A., Tsofina L.M. and  Shklovski-Kordi N.E. (1988). "Unusual biochemistry of changes in neuron membrane permeability evoked by cAMP". FEBS Letters. 236 (2): 445–449. 1988-08-29. doi:10.1016/0014-5793(88)80074-7. ISSN 0014-5793.

Liberman, E. A.; Minina, S. V.; Shklovsky-Kordi, N. E. (1989-01-01). "Quantum molecular computer model of the neuron and a pathway to the union of the sciences". Biosystems. 22 (2): 135–154. doi:10.1016/0303-2647(89)90042-7. ISSN 0303-2647.

Liberman, E. A.; Minina, S. V. (1995-01-01). "Molecular quantum computer of neuron". Biosystems. Proceeding of the 1993 Meeting of International Society for Molecular Electronics and Biocomputing. 35 (2): 203–207. doi:10.1016/0303-2647(94)01515-9. ISSN 0303-2647.

Liberman, E. A.; Minina, S. V. (1996-01-01). "Cell molecular computers and biological information as the foundation of nature's laws". Biosystems. Foundations of Information Science. 38 (2): 173–177. doi:10.1016/0303-2647(95)01588-4. ISSN 0303-2647.

Liberman, E. A; Minina, S. V; Shklovski-Kordi, N. E (1998-04-01). "Biological information and laws of nature". Biosystems. 46 (1): 103–106. doi:10.1016/S0303-2647(97)00086-5. ISSN 0303-2647.

Liberman, E. A.; Minina, S. V.; Moshkov, D. A.; Santalova, I. M.; Chistopolskiy, I. A.; Shklovski-Kordi, N. E. (2008-04-01). "Experimental testing of the role of cytoskeleton in the solution by neurons of problems facing the brain". Biochemistry (Moscow). 73 (4): 479–482. doi:10.1134/S0006297908040147. ISSN 1608-3040.

Minina, Svetlana V.; Shklovskiy-Kordi, Nikita E. (2022-07-01). "Neuron quantum computers and a way to unification of science: A compendium of Efim Liberman's scientific work". Biosystems. 217: 104684. doi:10.1016/j.biosystems.2022.104684. ISSN 0303-2647.

Liberman, E. A. (2022). "On the way to a new science". Biosystems. 215–216: 104647. 2022-06-01. doi:10.1016/j.biosystems.2022.104647. ISSN 0303-2647.

References 

1925 births
2011 deaths
Scientists from Moscow
Soviet inventors
Soviet biophysicists
Human subject research in Russia
Full Members of the USSR Academy of Sciences
Soviet military personnel of World War II